A Ferris wheel (also called  a Giant Wheel or an observation wheel) is an amusement ride consisting of a rotating upright wheel with multiple passenger-carrying components (commonly referred to as passenger cars, cabins, tubs, gondolas, capsules, or pods) attached to the rim in such a way that as the wheel turns, they are kept upright, usually by gravity. Some of the largest modern Ferris wheels have cars mounted on the outside of the rim, with electric motors to independently rotate each car to keep it upright. These cars are often referred to as capsules or pods.

The original Ferris Wheel was designed and constructed by George Washington Gale Ferris Jr. as a landmark for the 1893 World's Columbian Exposition in Chicago; however, wheels of this form predate Ferris's wheel by centuries. The generic term "Ferris wheel," now used in English for all such structures, has become the most common type of amusement ride at state fairs in the United States.

The tallest Ferris wheel, the  Ain Dubai in the United Arab Emirates, opened in October 2021. The previous record holder since 2014 had been the  High Roller in Las Vegas, Nevada, which opened to the public in March 2014.

Terminology and design

The term Ferris wheel comes from the maker of one of the first examples constructed for Chicago's World's Columbian Exposition by George Washington Gale Ferris Jr. in 1893.

Modern versions have been called observation wheels. In 1892, when the incorporation papers for the Ferris Wheel Company (constructors of the original 1893 Chicago Ferris Wheel) were filed, the purpose of the company was stated as: [construction and operation of] "wheels of the Ferris or other types for the purpose of observation or amusement".

Design variation includes single (cantilevered) or twin sided support for the wheel and whether the cars or capsules are oriented upright by gravity or by electric motors. The most prevalent design is the use of twin sided support and gravity-oriented capsules.

Early history

"Pleasure wheels", whose passengers rode in chairs suspended from large wooden rings turned by strong men, may have originated in 17th-century Bulgaria.

The Travels of Peter Mundy in Europe and Asia, 1608–1667 describes and illustrates "severall Sorts of Swinginge used in their Publique rejoyceings att their Feast of Biram" on 17 May 1620 at Philippopolis (now Plovdiv) in the Ottoman Balkans. Among means "lesse dangerous and troublesome" was one: 

Five years earlier, in 1615, Pietro Della Valle, a Roman traveller who sent letters from Constantinople, Persia, and India, attended a Ramadan festival in Constantinople. He describes the fireworks, floats, and great swings, then comments on riding the Great Wheel:

Similar wheels also appeared in England in the 17th century, and subsequently elsewhere around the world, including India, Romania, and Siberia.

A Frenchman, Antonio Manguino, introduced the idea to America in 1848, when he constructed a wooden pleasure wheel to attract visitors to his start-up fair in Walton Spring, Georgia.

Somers' Wheel

In 1892, William Somers installed three fifty-foot wooden wheels at Asbury Park, New Jersey; Atlantic City, New Jersey; and Coney Island, New York. The following year he was granted the first U.S. patent for a "Roundabout". George Washington Gale Ferris Jr. rode on Somers' wheel in Atlantic City prior to designing his wheel for the World's Columbian Exposition. In 1893 Somers filed a lawsuit against Ferris for patent infringement; however, Ferris and his lawyers successfully argued that the Ferris Wheel and its technology differed greatly from Somers' wheel, and the case was dismissed.

The original Ferris Wheel

The original Ferris wheel, sometimes referred to as the Chicago Wheel, was designed and constructed by Ferris Jr. and opened in 1893; however, an earlier wheel was created for the New York State fair in 1854, created by two Erie Canal workers.

It was intended to rival the  Eiffel Tower, the centerpiece of the 1889 Paris Exposition.

Ferris was a graduate of Rensselaer Polytechnic Institute and a Pittsburgh, Pennsylvania, bridge-builder. He began his career in the railroad industry and then pursued an interest in bridge building. Ferris understood the growing need for structural steel and founded G.W.G. Ferris & Co. in Pittsburgh, a firm that tested and inspected metals for railroads and bridge builders.

The wheel rotated on a 71-ton, 45.5-foot axle comprising what was at that time the world's largest hollow forging, manufactured in Pittsburgh by the Bethlehem Iron Company and weighing 89,320 pounds, together with two  cast-iron spiders weighing 53,031 pounds.

There were 36 cars, each fitted with 40 revolving chairs and able to accommodate up to 60 people, giving a total capacity of 2,160. The wheel carried some 38,000 passengers daily and took 20 minutes to complete two revolutions, the first involving six stops to allow passengers to exit and enter and the second a nine-minute non-stop rotation, for which the ticket holder paid 50 cents.

The Exposition ended in October 1893, and the wheel closed in April 1894 and was dismantled and stored until the following year. It was then rebuilt on Chicago's North Side, near the high-income enclave of Lincoln Park. William D. Boyce, then a local resident, filed a Circuit Court action against the owners of the wheel to have it removed, but without success. It operated there from October 1895 until 1903, when it was again dismantled, then transported by rail to St. Louis for the 1904 World's Fair and finally destroyed by controlled demolition using dynamite on May 11, 1906.

Antique Ferris wheels

The Wiener Riesenrad (German for "Viennese Giant Wheel") is a surviving example of 19th-century Ferris wheels. A demolition permit for the Riesenrad was issued in 1916, but due to a lack of funds with which to carry out the destruction, it survived.

Following the demolition of the  Grande Roue de Paris in 1920, the Riesenrad became the world's tallest extant Ferris wheel. In 1944 it burnt down, but was rebuilt the following year with 15 passenger cars, and remained the world's tallest extant wheel until its 97th year, when the  Technocosmos was constructed for Expo '85, at Tsukuba, Ibaraki, Japan.

Still in operation today, it is one of Vienna's most popular tourist attractions, and over the years has featured in numerous films (including Madame Solange d`Atalide (1914), Letter from an Unknown Woman (1948), The Third Man (1949), The Living Daylights (1987), Before Sunrise (1995)) and novels.

World's tallest Ferris wheels

Chronology of world's tallest wheels

Built for the World's Columbian Exposition in Chicago, Illinois, it was moved to St. Louis, Missouri, in 1904 for the Louisiana Purchase Exposition, and demolished there in 1906.
Construction began in March 1894 and it opened to the public on July 17, 1895. It stayed in service until 1906 and was demolished in 1907, having carried over 2.5 million passengers.
 1900: the Grande Roue de Paris was built for the Exposition Universelle, a world's fair held in Paris, France. It was demolished in 1920, but its  height was not surpassed until almost 90 years after its construction.
 1920: the Wiener Riesenrad was built to celebrate the Golden Jubilee of Emperor Franz Josef I, at the entrance of the Wurstelprater amusement park in Austria's capital Vienna.
 1985: Technocosmos, later renamed Technostar, was an 85-metre (279 ft) tall giant Ferris wheel, originally built for the Expo '85 World Fair in Tsukuba, Ibaraki, Japan. Work began on dismantling Technostar in November 2009.
 1989: the Cosmo Clock 21 was built for the YES '89 Yokohama Exposition at Minato Mirai 21, Yokohama, Japan.
Although officially opened on December 31, 1999, it did not open to the public until March 2000, because of technical problems.
It started rotating on February 11, and officially opened to the public on March 1, 2008.
It opened to the public on March 31, 2014.
It opened to the public on October 21, 2021, and is currently the world's tallest Ferris wheel in operation.

Timeline

Future wheels
Following the huge success of the  London Eye since it opened in 2000, giant Ferris wheels have been proposed for many other cities; however, a large number of these projects have stalled or failed.

Construction in progress

Abandoned projects

It was approved by Clark County Commission in March 2011, and announced at a groundbreaking ceremony in May 2011 that "We expect it to be up and running in time for New Year's 2012". The completion date for its construction on the Las Vegas Strip was subsequently put back several times. , construction had stalled. The project was eventually canceled due to lack of funding and the property was put up for sale in 2020, and again in 2022.

 The  New York Wheel was first reported in June 2012 and officially announced by mayor Michael Bloomberg in September 2012. Construction at Staten Island, New York City, alongside the planned Empire Outlets retail complex, was originally planned to begin early in 2014, and completion was originally expected to be in 2015. In October 2014 it was reported that construction would not begin until 2015, with completion delayed until 2017. This was subsequently further pushed back to April 2018, and then delayed indefinitely after developer NY Wheel fired lead contractor Mammoet-Starneth LLC in July 2017 amid a legal dispute over missed design and construction deadlines. In May 2018, the developers of the New York Wheel were given a last chance to obtain funding for the project. As per a ruling in Delaware bankruptcy court, the developers had 120 days, or until September 5, to find funding; however, on September 7, 2018, it was announced that the New York Wheel would not receive $140 million in city funding. The delays caused concern among EB-5 visa investors, who would lose their visas if the project was not constructed. An amendment to the bankruptcy court's ruling gave the developers a final 120-day extension to look for funding. If the developers did not get funding by January 2019, the project would be canceled and no further funding extensions would be given. On September 21, 2018, mayor Bill de Blasio said that the now-$900-million project would not receive a bailout from the city because it was too risky to support the project with bonds. As such, the city would not support tax free status for a $380 million bond sale to complete the project. Investors refused to proceed with construction without city support, and stated that it would allow the parts for the Ferris wheel to be auctioned off if the city did not provide funding. Subsequently, investors decided to cancel the project. At this point, investors had spent $450 million on the project.

Quiescent proposals

Incomplete, delayed, stalled, cancelled, failed, or abandoned proposals:
 The  Moscow View, proposed in 2011, was to have featured 48 monorail-mounted passenger capsules, each able to carry 48 passengers, travelling around a centreless non-rotating rim. At that time the timeframe for its construction was unknown and its site within Moscow had yet to be selected, though candidates were said to include the All-Russia Exhibition Centre, Gorky Park, Prospekt Vernadskogo, and Sparrow Hills. In December 2011 the project was reported to be stalled due to lack of City Hall approval.
 The  Beijing Great Wheel was originally due to begin construction in 2007 and to open in 2008, but went into receivership in 2010. It was one of at least five Great Wheel Corporation giant Ferris wheel projects which failed between 2007 and 2010.
 The  Baghdad Eye was proposed for Baghdad, Iraq, in August 2008. At that time, three possible locations had been identified, but no estimates of cost or completion date were given. In October 2008, it was reported that Al-Zawraa Park was expected to be the site, and a  wheel was installed there in March 2011.
 The  Great Dubai Wheel proposed for Dubailand, Dubai, United Arab Emirates, was granted planning permission in 2006 and expected to open in 2009, but it was subsequently confirmed that it would not be built. It was one of at least five Great Wheel Corporation giant Ferris wheel projects which failed between 2007 and 2010.
 The  Voyager was proposed several times for Las Vegas, Nevada.
 The  Bangkok Eye, to be located near the Chao Phraya River in Bangkok, Thailand, was announced by the Bangkok Metropolitan Administration on October 13, 2010, at which time the actual site and means of funding the 30-billion baht project had yet to be determined.

 The  Great Berlin Wheel was originally planned to open in 2008 but the project encountered financial obstacles.  It was one of at least five Great Wheel Corporation giant Ferris wheel projects which failed between 2007 and 2010.
 The  Jeddah Eye was proposed in 2008, as part of a development scheduled to open in 2012 in Saudi Arabia. Construction was to have begun in 2009, but there were no subsequent announcements. It was one of at least five Great Wheel Corporation giant Ferris wheel projects which failed between 2007 and 2010.
 A  Ferris wheel project involving Tussauds was considered for New York City's South Street Seaport in 2004, but was never built.
 The  Great Orlando Wheel was announced in June 2008 but then suspended in early 2009 after losing its funding. It was one of at least five Great Wheel Corporation giant Ferris wheel projects which failed between 2007 and 2010.
 The  Kolkata Eye was first proposed in 2011 for construction on the banks of Hooghly River in Kolkata, West Bengal, India. Favoured by Mamata Banerjee, Chief Minister of West Bengal, the project was originally valued at 100 crore rupees. This had risen to 300 crore rupees by May 2014 when Banerjee tweeted  is expected to be ready in a year's time". In January 2015 The Times of India reported that the project was "still a pipe dream".
 A  wheel for Manchester, England, was proposed by Manchester City Council in 2010 as a replacement for the transportable  Wheel of Manchester installation, with Piccadilly Gardens the possible site and completion expected by Christmas 2011.
 The  Eye on Malaysia, a Chinese-manufactured wheel with 54 passenger gondolas, was scheduled to begin operating in April 2013 at Malacca Island, Malaysia. In November 2012, Chief Minister of the state of Malacca Datuk Seri Mohd Ali Rustam stated that the installation of piles had brought the RM40 million wheel to 15 per cent of completion, and that "the installation of the wheel structure will begin in February [2013]." It was scheduled to open on December 1, 2011, but was never built.
 A  wheel planned for Manchester, England, for 2008, was never constructed.
 The  Pepsi Globe was proposed for the planned Meadowlands complex in New Jersey in February 2008 and originally due to open in 2009, then put on hold until 2010. It has since been further delayed, and construction of the host complex, originally due to be completed in 2007, has been stalled since 2009 due to financing problems.

Nippon Moon, described as a "giant observation wheel" by its designers, was reported in September 2013 to be "currently in development". At that time, its height was "currently undisclosed", but "almost twice the scale of the wheel in London". Its location, an unspecified Japanese city, was "currently under wraps", and its funding had "yet to be entirely secured". Commissioned by Ferris Wheel Investment Co., Ltd., and designed by UNStudio in collaboration with Arup, Mitsubishi Heavy Industries, and Experientia, it was expected to have 32 individually themed capsules and take 40 minutes to rotate once.

An earlier proposal for a  structure, the Shanghai Kiss, with capsules ascending and descending a pair of towers which met at their peaks instead of a wheel, was deemed too expensive at £100m.

Rus-3000, a  wheel planned to open in 2004 in Moscow, has since been reported cancelled. Subsequently, an approximately  wheel was considered for Gorky Central Park of Culture and Leisure, and a  wheel proposed for location near Sparrow Hills. Another giant wheel planned for Prospekt Vernadskogo for 2002 was also never built.

Variants

Indoor Ferris wheels 

At some malls and amusement parks indoor Ferris wheels were realized. The largest of its kind has a diametre of 47.6 metres and is situated in the 95 metres high Alem Cultural and Entertainment Center in Ashgabat.

Motorised capsules 

Wheels with passenger cars mounted external to the rim and independently rotated by electric motors, as opposed to wheels with cars suspended from the rim and kept upright by gravity, are uncommon. Typically they are called 'Observation wheels' but there is no standardised terminology.

Only a few Ferris wheels with motorised capsules have been built.
 The  Bay Glory is China's first giant observation wheel with motorised capsules.
 The  Ain Dubai, world's current tallest observation wheel.
 The  High Roller, world's tallest from 2014 to 2021, has externally mounted motorised capsules of a transparent spherical design, and is described as both a Ferris wheel and an observation wheel by the media.
 The  Singapore Flyer has cylindrical externally mounted motorised capsules and is described as an observation wheel by its operators, but was also credited as "world's largest Ferris wheel"  by the media when it opened in 2008.
 The  London Eye, typically described as a "giant Ferris wheel" by the media, has ovoidal externally mounted motorised capsules and is the "world's tallest cantilevered observation wheel" according to its operator.

 The  Melbourne Star (previously the Southern Star) in Australia has ovoidal externally mounted motorised capsules and is described by its operators as "the only observation wheel in the southern hemisphere", but also as a Ferris wheel by the media.

Official conceptual renderings of the proposed  New York Wheel also show a wheel equipped with externally mounted motorised capsules.

Centreless wheels

In the centreless (sometimes called hubless or spokeless) wheel design, there is no central hub and the rim of the wheel stays fixed in place. Instead, each car travels around the circumference of the rim. The first centreless wheel built was the Big O at Tokyo Dome City in Japan.

The first centreless wheel in North America opened in January 2019 at the indoor Méga Parc in Quebec City, Canada. The  wheel at Méga Parc was designed and manufactured by Larson International.

Transportable wheels
Transportable Ferris wheels are designed to be operated at multiple locations, as opposed to fixed wheels which are usually intended for permanent installation. Small transportable designs may be permanently mounted on trailers, and can be moved intact. Larger transportable wheels are designed to be repeatedly dismantled and rebuilt, some using water ballast instead of the permanent foundations of their fixed counterparts.

Fixed wheels are also sometimes dismantled and relocated. Larger examples include the original Ferris Wheel, which operated at two sites in Chicago, Illinois, and a third in St. Louis, Missouri; Technocosmos/Technostar, which moved to Expoland, Osaka, after Expo '85, Tsukuba, Ibaraki, for which it was built, ended; and Cosmo Clock 21, which added  onto its original  height when erected for the second time at Minato Mirai 21, Yokohama, in 1999.

The world's tallest transportable wheel  is the  Bussink Design R80XL.

One of the most famous transportable wheels is the  Roue de Paris, originally installed on the Place de la Concorde in Paris for the 2000 millennium celebrations. Roue de Paris left France in 2002 and in 2003–04 operated in Birmingham and Manchester, England. In 2005 it visited first Geleen then Amsterdam, Netherlands, before returning to England to operate at Gateshead. In 2006 it was erected at the Suan Lum Night Bazaar in Bangkok, Thailand, and by 2008 had made its way to Antwerp, Belgium.

Roue de Paris is a Ronald Bussink series R60 design using  of water ballast to provide a stable base. The R60 weighs , and can be erected in 72 hours and dismantled in 60 hours by a specialist team. Transport requires seven 20-foot container lorries, ten open trailer lorries, and one closed trailer lorry. Its 42-passenger cars can be loaded either 3 or 6 at a time, and each car can carry 8 people. Bussink R60 wheels have operated in Australia (Brisbane), Canada (Niagara Falls), France (Paris), Malaysia (Kuala Lumpur & Malacca), México (Puebla), UK (Belfast, Birmingham, Manchester, Sheffield), US (Atlanta, Myrtle Beach), and elsewhere.

Other notable transportable wheels include the  Steiger Ferris Wheel, which was the world's tallest transportable wheel when it began operating in 1980. It has 42 passenger cars, and weighs 450 tons. On October 11, 2010, it collapsed at the Kramermarkt in Oldenburg, Germany, during deconstruction.

Double and triple wheels
A double Ferris wheel designed to include a horizontal turntable was patented in 1939 by John F. Courtney, working for Velare & Courtney. In Courtney's design, there were two independent Ferris wheels, each rotating at either end of a cantilever arm. The cantilever arm was supported in the middle by a tall vertical support, and the cantilever arm itself rotated around its middle pivot point. The design was similar to the earlier Aeriocycle, but the double wheel patented by Courtney allowed the cantilever arm to make a complete rotation, while the Aeriocycle was limited to a seesaw motion. Courtney continued to file additional patents on improved designs through the 1950s to make them more portable, and at about the same time, the Velare brothers patented the "Space Wheel", a side-by-side double with four total Ferris wheels.

The design was later sold to the Allan Herschell Company in 1959 and marketed as the "Sky Wheel"; the first sale as the Sky Wheel was to 20th Century Rides in October 1960. The height and popularity of the Sky Wheel was eclipsed by larger single wheels in the late 1980s and early 1990s, and it has since largely disappeared from common use. , there are four known Sky Wheels that remain in operation.

In March 1966, Thomas Glen Robinson and Ralph G. Robinson received a patent for a Planetary Amusement Ride, which was a distinct double wheel design. In the Robinsons' patent, the cantilever arm was bent at a slightly obtuse angle, and the cars were carried on a spoked "spider" rotating structure at each end of the cantilever. With the obtuse-angle cantilever, one spider could be lowered to the ground in a horizontal plane so that all the cars on that spider could be unloaded and loaded simultaneously, while the spider on the other end of the cantilever would continue to rotate in a near-vertical plane.

Robinson sold two of these rides – Astrowheel, which operated at the former Six Flags AstroWorld in Houston, Texas, and Galaxy, which operated at Six Flags Magic Mountain in Valencia, California. Both were manufactured by Astron International Corporation. Astrowheel was part of the original lineup of rides when Astroworld opened in 1968; it was removed in 1981 to make way for the Warp 10 ride. Astrowheel had an eight-spoked spider at the end of each arm, and each tip had a separate car for eight cars in total on each end. In contrast, Galaxy had double the capacity with a four-spoked spider at the end of each arm; each tip bore an independent four-spoked sub-spider for sixteen cars in total on each end. Like Astrowheel, Galaxy was part of the lineup at Magic Mountain when the park opened in 1971, and was removed in 1980 when Six Flags took over ownership of both parks.

Swiss broker Intamin marketed a similar series of double wheels manufactured by Waagner-Biro, comprising a vertical column supporting a straight cantilever arm, with each end of the cantilever arm ending in a spoked Ferris wheel. The first Intamin produced was Giant Wheel at Hersheypark in Hershey, Pennsylvania, which operated from 1973 to 2004. Other double wheels made by Waagner-Biro/Intamin include Zodiac (Kings Island, Mason, Ohio; 1975–86; moved to Wonderland Sydney and operated 1989–2004), Scorpion (Parque de la Ciudad, Buenos Aires, Argentina; 1982–2003), and Double Wheel (Kuwait Entertainment City, Kuwait City, Kuwait; 1984–91).

A triple variant was custom designed for the Marriott Corporation and debuted at both Marriott's Great America parks (now Six Flags Great America, Gurnee, Illinois, and California's Great America, Santa Clara) in 1976 as Sky Whirl. Each ride had three main components: the three spiders/wheels with their passenger cars; the triple-spoked supporting arm; and the single central supporting column. Each wheel rotated about one of the three ends of the supporting arm. The supporting arm would in turn rotate around its central hub as a single unit about the top of the supporting column. The axis about which the supporting arm turned was offset from vertical (i.e., the plane of rotation was not horizontal), so that as the supporting arm rotated, each wheel was raised and lowered. When lowered, one wheel was horizontal at ground level. At the same time, the other wheels remained raised and continued to rotate in a near-vertical plane at considerable height. The lowered horizontal wheel was brought to a standstill for simultaneous loading and unloading of all its passenger cars.

The Sky Whirl in Santa Clara was filmed for a memorable rescue scene in Beverly Hills Cop III (renamed to "The Spider" for the film). The Santa Clara ride, renamed Triple Wheel in post-Marriott years, closed on September 1, 1997. The Gurnee ride closed in 2000. Two triple wheels were built for Asian clients: Tree Triple Wheel at Seibu-en (Tokorozawa, Saitama, Japan; 1985–2004) and Hydra at Lotte World (Seoul, South Korea; 1989–97).

Eccentric wheels
An eccentric wheel (sometimes called a sliding wheel or coaster wheel) differs from a conventional Ferris wheel in that some or all of its passenger cars are not fixed directly to the rim of the wheel, but instead slide on rails between the rim and the hub as the wheel rotates.

The two most famous eccentric wheels are Wonder Wheel, at Deno's Wonder Wheel Amusement Park, Coney Island, US, and Pixar Pal-A-Round (previously Sun Wheel and Mickey's Fun Wheel), at Disney California Adventure, US. The latter is a replica of the former. There is a second replica in Yokohama Dreamland, Japan.

Each passenger car is decorated with the face of a Pixar character. Sixteen slide inward and outward as the wheel rotates, the remainder are fixed to the rim. There are separate boarding queues for sliding and fixed cars, so that passengers may choose between the two. Inspired by Coney Island's 1920 Wonder Wheel, it was designed by Walt Disney Imagineering and Waagner Biro, completed in 2001 as the Sun Wheel, later refurbished and reopened in 2009 as Mickey's Fun Wheel, and again rethemed as Pixar Pal-A-Round in 2018.

Gallery of notable wheels

Major designers, manufacturers, and operators

Allan Herschell Company (merged with Chance Rides in 1970)
Seattle Wheel (debuted 1962): 16  cars, 2 passengers per car
Sky Wheel (debuted 1939; also manufactured by Chance Rides): a double wheel, with the wheels rotating about opposite ends of a pair of parallel beams, and the beams rotating about their centres; 8 cars per wheel, 2 passengers per car

Chance Morgan / Chance Rides / Chance Wheels / Chance American Wheels
Astro Wheel (debuted 1967): 16 cars (8 facing one way, 8 the other), 2 passengers per car

Eli Bridge Company
Contemporary models include:
Signature Series: 16 cars, 3 passengers per car; transportable
Eagle Series: 16 cars, 3 passengers per car; transportable
HY-5 Series: 12 cars, 3 passengers per car; transportable
Aristocrat Series: 16 cars, fixed site
Standard Series: 12 cars, fixed site
Lil' Wheel: 6 cars, 3 passengers per car; transportable and fixed site models

Great Wheel Corporation (merged with World Tourist Attractions in 2009 to form Great City Attractions)

Intamin / Waagner-Biro (Rides brokered by Intamin — manufactured by Waagner-Biro)
Mickey's Fun Wheel: an eccentric (sliding) wheel
Giant Wheel: a double wheel
Sky Whirl: a triple wheel
The Wheel at ICON Park Orlando

Mir / Pax

Ronald Bussink (formerly Nauta Bussink; then Ronald Bussink Professional Rides; then Bussink Landmarks since 2008)
Wheels of Excellence range (sold to Vekoma in 2008) has included:
Bussink Design:

Sanoyas Rides Corporation (has built more than 80 Ferris wheels)

Senyo Kogyo Co, Ltd.

World Tourist Attractions / Great City Attractions / Wheels Entertainments / Freij Entertainment International
Belfast Wheel
Brighton Wheel
Roue de Paris
Royal Windsor Wheel
Wheel of Birmingham
Wheel of Brisbane
Wheel of Manchester
Wheel of Sheffield
Yorkshire Wheel

See also
List of tallest buildings and structures
Observation tower
Gyro tower

References

External links
 
 1904 Louisiana Purchase Exposition Ferris Wheel in various stages of construction from St. Louis Public Library Digital Collections
 Guide to the Norman D. Anderson Collection on Ferris Wheels and Related Materials circa 1890-2015
Ain Dubai

 
American inventions
Articles which contain graphical timelines
1893 introductions